"Miniver Cheevy" is a narrative poem written by Edwin Arlington Robinson and first published in The Town down the River in 1910. The poem, written in quatrains of iambic tetrameter for three lines, followed by a catalectic line of only three iambs, relates the story of a hopeless romantic who spends his days thinking about what might have been if only he had been born earlier in time.

Some scholars have suggested that the character of Miniver is meant to be Robinson's self-aware skewering of his own sense of being an anachronism or throwback, but others have indicated that, while this may be true, Miniver also represents a critique of Robinson's culture in general. Regardless, the character portrait is similar to Robinson's Richard Cory in its presentation of a deeply discontented individual who is unable to integrate with society and is bent on self-destruction, albeit at different paces. Robinson's preoccupation with these sorts of characters is one of the reasons why some have dubbed him "America's poet laureate of unhappiness."

References in popular culture
 In Woody Allen's 2011 film Midnight in Paris, the lead character Gil is compared to Miniver Cheevy by a condescending friend of his fiancee.
 In Joseph Heller's Catch-22, Major Major Major Major is also compared with Miniver Cheevy because of his late birth.
 Helene Hanff compared herself to Miniver Cheevy in her 1970 book 84, Charing Cross Road.

External links

Critiques of this poem
  (multiple versions)

Notes

American poems
Works by Edwin Arlington Robinson